Fârdea is a commune in Timiș County, Romania. It is composed of seven villages: Drăgșinești, Fârdea (commune seat), Gladna Montană, Gladna Română, Hăuzești, Mâtnicu Mic and Zolt.

Geography 
Fârdea is located in the eastern extremity of Timiș County, at the foot of Poiana Ruscă Mountains. The relief has the appearance of a huge amphitheater descending from the edges of the commune to the central depression valleys with some steep hills in the southeast and softer ones in the northwest.

History 
Fârdea was first mentioned in a Hungarian diploma in 1361. It was one of the most important medieval settlements in Banat, where a Vlach district has existed since ancient times. In the 14th–15th centuries it was called Turd, which comes from Furd, a personal name mentioned around 1291. In a document from 1454, the chapter from Arad reports to Ladislaus V that John Hunyadi became the owner of the Romanian district of Twerd. The document mentions that this district included the villages of Bănia, Lower and Upper Gladna, Prodanfalva, Zolthur, Cărămida, Dryinfalva, Brekafalva, Lower and Upper Igazfalva, Puril, Mâtnic, Boglyafalva, Costenești and Stefanfalva, many of which no longer exist. At the end of the 15th century, the district no longer belonged to Temes County, but to Hunyad County.

Demographics 

Fârdea had a population of 1,750 inhabitants at the 2011 census, down 9% from the 2002 census. Most inhabitants are Romanians (94.23%), with a minority of Roma (1.49%). For 2.97% of the population, ethnicity is unknown. By religion, most inhabitants are Orthodox (85.43%), but there are also minorities of Pentecostals (5.54%) and Baptists (5.26%). For 2.97% of the population, religious affiliation is unknown.

References 

Communes in Timiș County
Localities in Romanian Banat